The 2011–12 Slovenian Second League season started on 6 August 2011 and ended on 19 May 2012. Each team played a total of 27 matches.

Clubs

League table

Results

First and second round

Third round

See also
2011–12 Slovenian PrvaLiga
2011–12 Slovenian Third League

External links
Football Association of Slovenia 

Slovenian Second League seasons
2011–12 in Slovenian football
Slovenian Second League, 2011-12